Curtis L. Lawson (1935–2008) was an American state politician from Tulsa, Oklahoma. In 1964 he was one of the first three African Americans elected to the Oklahoma House of Representatives since A. C. Hamlin in 1908.

Lawson represented a district in Tulsa from 1965 to 1969. He was an advocate for civil rights legislation, and also introduced a controversial abortion rights bill in 1967.  After his legislative service he encountered legal difficulties, including serving a prison term for embezzlement (for which he was later pardoned).

He is featured in the Oklahoma History Center's One Man One Vote exhibit.

References

External links 
"One [of] the First African-Americans to Re-enter the Oklahoma Legislature, Curtis L. Lawson Dies at Age 72", PRWeb, May 1, 2008

1935 births
2008 deaths
African-American state legislators in Oklahoma
Democratic Party members of the Oklahoma House of Representatives
Politicians from Tulsa, Oklahoma
20th-century American politicians
20th-century African-American politicians
21st-century African-American people